Patriot Games is a thriller novel, written by Tom Clancy and published in July 1987. Without Remorse, released six years later, is an indirect prequel, and it is chronologically the first book featuring Jack Ryan, the main character in most of Clancy's novels. The novel focuses on Ryan being the target of Irish terrorist group Ulster Liberation Army for thwarting their kidnapping attempt on the Prince and Princess of Wales in London. It debuted at number one on the New York Times bestseller list. A film adaptation, starring Harrison Ford as Ryan, premiered on June 5, 1992.

Plot summary
A kidnapping attempt on the Prince and Princess of Wales and their infant son occurs at the Mall in London. The attack is orchestrated by members of the Ulster Liberation Army, a splinter group of the Provisional Irish Republican Army. However, Jack Ryan intervenes, incapacitating one of the attackers, Sean Miller. During the gun battle however, Ryan is shot in the shoulder by one of the other gunmen, John Michael McCrory, as they exchange fire. McCrory is killed, and Miller is later arrested.

While recovering from his wound, Ryan is honored by the British government and is knighted. Meanwhile, Miller is sentenced to life imprisonment for the kidnapping attempt; however, his ULA compatriots led by Kevin O’Donnell free him while he is being transported to a maximum security prison in the Isle of Wight. They are then aided by their Libyan allies in escaping into their secret camp in the North African desert, and Miller vows revenge on Ryan.

Ryan returns to teach history at the United States Naval Academy in Annapolis, Maryland, confident that the ULA will not attack him in the United States. Unbeknownst to him, Miller had persuaded O’Donnell to launch an operation in the U.S. aimed at targeting Ryan and his family, and had recruited the assistance of an African-American domestic terrorist group known as “the Movement” to do so. Though primarily for revenge, the operation is also designed to reduce American support for the rival PIRA, which is to be blamed for the upcoming attack. The assassin sent to kill Ryan is intercepted before he manages to complete his task, however his wife Cathy and daughter Sally are seriously injured when Miller causes their car to crash on a freeway; they are rescued by state troopers and volunteer firemen and later transported by helicopter to the University of Maryland Medical Center for treatment.

After the attack on his family, Ryan accepts an offer from the Central Intelligence Agency (CIA) to start working as an analyst at their headquarters. Later, the Prince and Princess of Wales come to visit Ryan at his house in Maryland. However, this provides another opportunity for the ULA, once again recruiting the services of “the Movement”. The night of the visit, they launch a sneak attack on Ryan's home to kidnap the Prince and Princess of Wales, as well as Ryan's family.

Although several guards around the house are killed, Ryan, his friend, fighter pilot Robert “Robby” Jackson, and the Prince manage to dispatch some of the terrorists. They later receive assistance from the local police, the United States Marines, and sailors from the U.S. Naval Academy, who prevent the remaining terrorists from escaping the country in a container ship. Ryan encounters a cornered Miller and tries to kill him, but is restrained by his weapons instructor. After the ULA terrorists are apprehended, he arrives in Annapolis to witness the birth of his son, Jack Ryan, Jr.

Characters
 Jack Ryan: History teacher at the United States Naval Academy in Annapolis, Maryland; later an analyst for the Central Intelligence Agency.
 Dr. Caroline "Cathy" Ryan: Ophthalmic surgeon at the Wilmer Eye Institute, which is part of the Johns Hopkins University School of Medicine; Jack Ryan's wife.
 Olivia "Sally" Ryan: Jack and Cathy Ryan's daughter.
 Prince of Wales
 Princess of Wales
 Special Agent Daniel E. "Dan" Murray: Legal attaché for the FBI at the United States Embassy in London.
 James "Jimmy" Owens: English police officer specializing in anti-terrorism operations.
 Robby Jackson: Fighter pilot and instructor at the U.S. Naval Academy in Annapolis, Maryland; Jack Ryan's friend.
 Sean Miller: Operations officer for the Ulster Liberation Army (ULA).
 Kevin Joseph O’Donnell: Leader of the ULA.
 James Greer: CIA Deputy Director of Intelligence. Personally recruits Ryan into the agency.
 Marty Cantor: Admiral Greer's assistant, later replaced by Ryan.
 Sergeant Major Noah Breckenridge: Security section chief and head firearms instructor at the U.S. Naval Academy in Annapolis.
 Padraig “Paddy” O’Neil: Representative for the Provisional Irish Republican Army in the British Parliament.
 Dennis Cooley: Rare bookshop owner; agent for the ULA.
 Geoffrey Watkins: Liaison between the British Foreign Office and the Royal Family; revealed to be the ULA mole that secretly passed information to O'Donnell through Cooley. Commits suicide after Miller, O'Donnell, and other ULA terrorists get arrested.
 Alexander Dobbens: Member of an African-American domestic terrorist group referred to as "the Movement"; assisted the ULA in their operations in the United States.

Themes
Patriot Games was notable for subverting the moral ambiguity of the antagonists in espionage novels by John le Carré, Len Deighton, and Robert Ludlum. According to Marc Cerasini's essay on the novel, “Clancy’s sensible revulsion toward the terrorists is so strident and intense...that it verges on the physical.” He added that “the author’s understandable disgust toward his villains is ‘bourgeois’, for there is not a shred of sympathy for these Irish ‘patriots’.”

The novel is also said to be inspired by the gothic horror genre in the depiction of the ULA as “twisted political misfits” who practice political violence in the vein of Count Dracula and his “family”, as well as other gothic elements like the presence of the Prince and Princess of Wales.

Development
Clancy started working on Patriot Games in 1979, along with other novels which would later be published: The Hunt for Red October (1984) and The Cardinal of the Kremlin (1988). He says of his passion for accuracy and detail: "When I was in London, researching Patriot Games, I spent 20 hours walking around the Mall with a camera, clipboard and tape recorder, just choreographing my opening chapter, to make sure it would happen exactly the way I wrote it. Later, when I took my kids there, I could tell them, 'This is the tree that Jack Ryan hid his wife and daughter behind, and that's the road where the bad guys escaped.' I feel a moral obligation to my readers to get it right. In the insurance business, you have to pay attention to details or a client could lose everything. A doctor has to, a cop, a fireman, why not a writer?" Although he was criticized for doubling down on technical details in the novel, Clancy considers Patriot Games to be his best.

Discussing the final scene where Jack Ryan lets the primary antagonist Sean Miller live instead of killing him, Clancy remarked: "Of all the letters I got on Patriot Games, not one said, 'He should have killed the little bastard.' Personally I'd have done it. You harm my kids and I'll blow you away. You don't touch my kids. But I'm not Jack Ryan. He has to be in control. He plays by the rules."

Reception
Commercially, Patriot Games debuted at number one on the New York Times bestseller list for the week of August 2, 1987. It has since sold over 1,063,000 hardcover copies by the next year.

Critically, the book received generally positive reviews. The New York Times praised it as "a powerful piece of popular fiction; its plot, if implausible, is irresistible, and its emotions are universal." However, Kirkus Reviews's verdict is mixed, stating that "Exciting shoot-outs and chases, and lots of Royal wish-fulfillment; but without naval authenticity to bolster the prose, Clancy is a fish out of water."

Film adaptation

The novel was adapted as a feature film, which was released on June 5, 1992. Jack Ryan was played by Harrison Ford and Sean Miller was played by Sean Bean. The film is notable for being the sequel to the previous movie The Hunt for Red October (1990), although the order is the opposite in the books. Additionally, the Prince and Princess of Wales were replaced by Lord Holmes, Secretary of State for Northern Ireland and the Queen's cousin, as the ULA's primary target. Patriot Games spent two weeks as the No. 1 film, eventually grossing $178,051,587 in worldwide box office business. It has garnered generally positive reviews, and earned a 73% "Fresh" rating on Rotten Tomatoes based on 33 reviews.

Conversely, the movie was criticized by Clancy for deviating too much from the source material, stating that "I don't like eating dirt, and I won't eat any from these guys." "There is only one, maybe two, scenes in the shooting script that correspond to a scene in the book," Clancy later added. "They have a movie called Patriot Games that uses my characters—but it's not my story." He eventually asked for his name to be removed from the film's promotional materials, and in an apparent countermove, entered negotiations with the same team at Paramount Pictures to sell the rights to his other novel The Sum of All Fears (1991). By the time the film was released in 2002, the author had cooled off on the idea of having his books made into films.

References

1987 American novels
American thriller novels
Techno-thriller novels
Prequel novels
Novels by Tom Clancy
Ryanverse
Works about the United States Marine Corps
American novels adapted into films
G. P. Putnam's Sons books
Novels set in Wales
Works about the Irish Republican Army